Poynings is a village and civil parish in West Sussex, England, UK.

Poynings may also refer to the following English people:

 Baron Poynings, title in the Peerage of England, 1337–1489 and 1545
 Sir Adrian Poynings (c.1512–1571), military commander and administrator
 Sir Edward Poynings (1459–1521) soldier, administrator, diplomat, and Lord Deputy of Ireland
 Sir Robert Poynings (c.1419–1461), Yorkist in the Wars of the Roses
 Poynings Heron (1548–1595), commander during the Spanish Armada
 Sir Poynings More, 1st baronet (1606–1649), MP

See also
 Poynings' Law (disambiguation), various laws passed by the Parliament of Ireland summoned by Edward Poynings in 1494–5